is a passenger railway station located in Tsurumi-ku, Yokohama, Kanagawa Prefecture, Japan, operated by the private railway company Keikyū.

Lines
Keikyū Tsurumi Station is served by the Keikyū Main Line and is located 15.3 kilometers from the terminus of the line at Shinagawa  Station in Tokyo.

Station layout
The station consists of an island platform and a side platform serving three elevated tracks..The platforms are on the third floor of the station building, with the wicket gates and main concourse on the second floor.

Station layout

History
Keikyū Tsurumi Station opened on December 24, 1905 as a temporary stop on the Keihin Electric Railway. It was elevated to a full station on November 1, 1925 and renamed . It was renamed to its present name on 1 June 1987.

Keikyū introduced station numbering to its stations on 21 October 2010; Keikyū Tsurumi Station was assigned station number KK29.

Passenger statistics
In fiscal 2019, the station was used by an average of 33,348 passengers daily. 

The passenger figures for previous years are as shown below.

Surrounding area
 Tsurumi Station
 Tsurumi Ward Office
 Tsurumi Shrine

See also
 List of railway stations in Japan

References

External links

 

}

Railway stations in Kanagawa Prefecture
Railway stations in Japan opened in 1905
Keikyū Main Line
Railway stations in Yokohama